Sverdlov Street is an east–west street between Viktor Vashchuk Proyezd and Serebrennikovskaya Street in Zheleznodorozhny and Tsentralny districts of Novosibirsk, Russia. The street crosses Sovetskaya Street and Krasny Avenue.

History
The street was previously called the Vorontsovskaya Street, but was renamed in 1920.

Architecture
 Mashtakov House is a house built in 1903. Baron Ungern may have been executed in this building.
 Sibrevcom Building is a building designed by Andrey Kryachkov. It was built in 1926.

Gallery

Organizations
 Novosibirsk Oblast Administration
 Novosibirsk State Art School
 Novosibirsk State Oblast Scientific Library
 State Archive of Novosibirsk Oblast

References

Tsentralny City District, Novosibirsk
Zheleznodorozhny City District, Novosibirsk
Streets in Novosibirsk